Nackasändaren is a facility for FM and TV-transmission at Nacka in Metropolitan Stockholm. It used from 1956 to 1983 two  guyed masts, which were designed as mast radiators for mediumwave transmission and therefore insulated against ground. In 1965 a further mast, a  guyed steel lattice mast for FM and TV-transmissions was built. This mast is in opposite to the lower masts grounded, but carried in its upper guys insulators in order not to disturb the radiation pattern of the mediumwave transmitter. After termination of the AM transmissions, which occurred until 1978 on 773 kHz and after 1978 on 774 kHz on June 1, 1981, the old masts were demolished on November 2, 1983, and December 7, 1983. At their location a second  steel framework mast for FM- and TV-transmission was built in 1984.
After cancellation of the mediumwave transmission, the insulators of the guys of the older 299 metres tall mast were obsolete and removed.

See also
 Radio masts and towers
 List of masts
 List of tallest structures in Sweden

External links
 Passegen Hem
 Passegen Hem
 Passegen Hem

Nacka Municipality
Towers in Sweden
Buildings and structures in Stockholm County